The scoters are stocky seaducks in the genus Melanitta. The drakes are mostly black and have swollen bills, the females are brown. They breed in the far north of Europe, Asia, and North America, and winter farther south in temperate zones of those continents. They form large flocks on suitable coastal waters. These are tightly packed, and the birds tend to take off together. Their lined nests are built on the ground close to the sea, lakes or rivers, in woodland or tundra. These species dive for crustaceans and molluscs.

Taxonomy
The genus Melanitta was introduced by the German zoologist Friedrich Boie in 1822. The type species was designated in 1838 as the velvet scoter by Thomas Campbell Eyton.  The genus name combines the Ancient Greek melas meaning "black" and netta meaning "duck".

The genus contains six species:

The presumed fossil "scoter" Melanitta ceruttii, which lived in California during the Late Pliocene, is now placed in the genus Histrionicus.

References

Ducks